Tiny Town, in Springfield, Missouri, was the first city built in miniature and had over a thousand structures. A smaller village version was completed in 1919, while the larger full version was completed in 1925. It was motivated primarily by a local homebuilding promotion. The project involved 10,000 students from eighteen Springfield public high schools. The superintendent of the school system was a key instigator of the project and used it as a teaching aid to instruct students in government, home-ownership and citizenship.

Background 

Tiny Town was the first complete city built in miniature. The project's primary motivation was "Build Now," a promotion originated by the local director of publicity W. H. Johnson to stimulate Springfield's home-construction industry. Tiny Town, a 1920s community-involvement project and miniature park, was produced by the Springfield director of publicity and the chamber of commerce. A  village version, consisting of about 400 houses and 250 garages, was first exhibited on the basement floor of the Springfield convention center in 1919. It was built by teenagers, who scaled Tiny Town at one-half inch to the foot (1:24). The complete miniature city was built in 1925 in a city park, with 1,000 houses and about 200 other structures (including garages, apartments, and public buildings). It encompassed every aspect of an early-20th-century city.

W. W. Thomas, superintendent of the Springfield public-school system, believed that home-ownership and citizenship responsibilities were a part of education and was a key instigator of the project. He involved students in the governmental duties associated with the project, which used the manager-commission form of government to run the lilliputian city. Concepts such as women’s suffrage and political ambition came into play. A 14-year-old orphaned girl was elected Tiny Town's mayor and a 15-year-old boy became its city manager, defeating sixteen other nominees in a political campaign.

Description 

The miniature city project involved students from eighteen Springfield public high schools. The students, who were learning construction and handicraft, built the city of about 1,200 structures under the supervision of their teachers. It consisted of 1,000 miniature houses, in several neighborhoods, and 200 other structures. The miniature buildings and houses were built according to standard construction plans, and lumber and building-materials companies donated items for the project. The buildings and homes were landscaped with real grass. Their interiors were furnished and decorated like a full-sized house or building. The buildings were scaled at one-half inch to the foot. Tiny Town, with water mains and electric lights, was laid out on streets like a real city.

Students of the vocational-training departments of Springfield's public schools constructed the miniature city buildings. Much of the smaller work done by the students was done at home to involve their parents. Ideas introduced to the students were how to be a citizen of a community, home ownership and the infrastructure of city design. Ten thousand students built the outdoor miniature city over a ten-week period. Tiny Town, assembled on a five-acre city parcel, was 1,000 feet long and 250 feet wide——representing  of real land. The miniature city had  of paths through neighborhoods containing houses, schools, churches, libraries, stores, apartments, and government buildings.

Prizes 
Prizes were awarded for the best structures, the best art posters, and the best cutout books made by students about Tiny Town. The prizes were available only to vocational-training students and students otherwise involved in the project. Student officials were in charge during the awards at the Springfield convention center. The carpentry of the framing and exterior of the homes was done primarily by the boys. The supervisor of the art department of the participating schools had an interior home-decoration contest to involve the girls, who made draperies, furniture, and floor coverings and beautified the homes' interiors.

Outcome 

Tiny Town was finished and available for public viewing on May 25, 1925. The event was covered by newspapers throughout the United States. 
A  Tiny Town Times newspaper, explaining the events and exhibits, was published daily during the exposition and distributed to other towns. The students reported scoops such as the names of Tiny Town's streets.

The exhibit of miniature houses at Grant Beach Park in Springfield had an admission charge. It was open to the public for three weeks, until June 13, and discounted children's tickets were available at businesses throughout the city. Many individuals and businesses in Springfield donated money to the project.

The Build Now promotion and the Tiny Town project substantially increased homebuilding in Springfield. When the exhibition was over, many of the tiny homes were sold and the prize-winning structures were used as window displays in Springfield's major stores. The Tiny Town committee unsuccessfully petitioned the United States Post Office to appoint a "postmaster" and obtain a mailing address for the miniature city during the exposition. Before the Tiny Town exhibition opened, it was announced that a group of "officials" from the miniature city would go to Washington, D.C. to invite President Calvin Coolidge to visit; although people from all over the United States came to see the exhibit, Coolidge did not.

Prize-winning models

References

Sources

External links 

 Tiny Town Times picture of the miniature city's teenage "officials"
 Tiny Town Times picture of Jarrett Junior High School students constructing Tiny Town buildings

Buildings and structures in Springfield, Missouri
1925 in Missouri
Miniature parks
1919 establishments in Missouri
1920s in Missouri